Martin Four is a 2001 short film written and directed by Ben Hackworth. It stars Susan Lyons and Todd MacDonald. It was photographed by Katie Milwright. Production Designer Duncan Maurice.

The film was the second Australian short film to appear in the Cinefondation competition of Cannes Film Festival.

2001 films
Australian drama short films
2001 short films
2000s English-language films
2000s Australian films